This is a List of Phi Sigma Sigma chapters including both active and inactive chapters.

Chapters

Canada

United States

References 

Phi Sigma Sigma
chapters